Neil McPherson OBE, (26 September 1892 – 12 November 1957) was a Welsh rugby union player who represented Scotland and the British Lions. McPherson played club rugby for Newport and captained the team in the 1921/22 season.

McPherson gained his first cap for Scotland in 1920 against Wales at Inverleith alongside teammate Dr E Fahmy, who also played his club rugby in Wales. Scotland won 9–5, and prevented Wales from winning the Grand Slam. After accepting a gold watch as part of Newport's invincible 1922/23 season, the Scottish Rugby Union suspended McPherson for what they saw as an act of professionalism; but he was later re-instated. McPherson's last game for Scotland was against Ireland, but was chosen to join the British Lions 1924 tour of South Africa, when he played in all four tests against the Springboks.

International matches played
Scotland
  1920, 1921, 1923
  1921
  1920, 1923
  1920

British Lions
  1924, 1924, 1924, 1924

References

 ESPN Scrum – Neil McPherson

1892 births
1957 deaths
Rugby union players from Cardiff
Welsh people of Scottish descent
Scottish rugby union players
Welsh rugby union players
Newport RFC players
British & Irish Lions rugby union players from Wales
British & Irish Lions rugby union players from Scotland
Officers of the Order of the British Empire
Scotland international rugby union players
Rugby union flankers
Rugby union props